The W. J. Beal Botanical Garden is a  botanical garden located on the campus of Michigan State University in East Lansing, Michigan, United States. It is claimed to be the oldest continually maintained university botanical garden in the United States and is open to the public without charge year-round during daylight hours.

The garden displays 1,800 plant taxa, in economic, systematic, landscape and ecological groupings.

The botanic garden was started by Prof. William James Beal as part of the Department of Botany to serve as an outdoor teaching and research laboratory. Work towards starting the garden began in 1872 with a nursery, followed in 1873 by test plots of 140 species of forage grasses and clovers in a portion of the garden referred to as "Sleepy Hollow". Shortly after founding the botanic garden, Professor Beal established an arboretum on campus in 1874 which began as two rows of swamp white oaks. For the period of time from 1877 to 1924, the garden was known as "The Botanic Garden" or "Wild Garden" at Michigan Agricultural College. Shortly after Professor Beal's death on May 12, 1924, the garden was officially named for him on December 17, 1924, by the Michigan State Board of Agriculture upon the recommendation of the Department of Botany. After Professor Beal's retirement in 1910, Professor H.T. Darlington was appointed director of the botanic garden in 1914 and served until 1930. The gardens developed from these starting points until 1950, when they were reorganized and redesigned by Prof. Milton Baron to form today's four main collections.

In 1954, the garden began participating in the international seed exchange program, publishing its first Index Seminum, and in 1961 was extended with a collection of acidophilous plants including rhododendrons, azaleas, and ferns. More recently, a collection of Michigan's endangered plants was added in 1986, and the non-flowering vascular plant collection was started in 2001 with ephedras, conifers, ginkgo, cycads, ferns, horsetails and clubmosses.

See also 
 List of botanical gardens and arboretums in the United States

External links

Official website
M.A.C. — Botanic Garden

References

Michigan State University campus
Michigan State Historic Sites in Ingham County
Botanical gardens in Michigan
East Lansing, Michigan
Geography of Lansing, Michigan
Protected areas of Ingham County, Michigan